Cordylomera elegans is a species of longhorn beetles in the tribe Elaphidiini. It is found in South Africa.

References

External links 
 Cordylomera elegans at Biolib.cz

Beetles described in 1904
Elaphidiini
Insects of South Africa